Diaris De La Caridad Perez Ramos (born 16 November 1998) is a Cuban female volleyball player. She is a member of the Cuba women's national volleyball team and played for La Habana in 2017.

Career 
She was part of the Cuban national team at the 2015 FIVB Volleyball Women's U23 World Championship, and 2018 FIVB Volleyball Women's World Championship.

Clubs 

  La Habana (2017)
  Chamalieres (2020)

References

External links 
 Diaris Perez helps Cuba to shake off Mexico in five tough sets | FIVB - Press release
 Perez and Cuba dream of following historical footsteps | FIVB - Press release
 2016 U20 NORCECA Continental Championship: CUB vs. USA 7-30-16 Diaris Perez
 Argentina open U20 Pan Am Cup with victory over Dominican Republic

1998 births
Living people
Cuban women's volleyball players
Place of birth missing (living people)
Volleyball players at the 2015 Pan American Games
Pan American Games competitors for Cuba
Wing spikers
21st-century Cuban women